Pacific Banana is a 1981 Australian bawdy comedy film which reunites the star and writer of Alvin Purple.

Plot
Martin is a pilot who sneezes whenever he is aroused and loses an erection. He works for an airline owned by Sir Harry Blandings, whose wife tries to seduce Martin but then claims he made a move on her. Blandings sacks him but gets him a job at broken down Banana Airlines, where he flies with handsome Paul, who sleeps around despite being engaged to two sexy airline hostesses, Sally and Mandy.

Martin makes several attempts to have sex, but constantly fails to get an erection, even with the help of the beautiful Candy Bubbles and her female friends. Paul constantly cheats on Sally and Mandy but they keep going back to him. Martin is constantly chased by Blandings school girl daughter, Julia. Eventually Julia tells Martin she loves him which cures his impotence and he can have sex.

Cast
Graeme Blundell as Martin
Robin Stewart as Paul
Deborah Gray as Sally
Alyson Best as Mandy
Helen Hemingway as Julia Blandings
Manuia Taie as Laya
Luan Peters as Candy Bubbles
Audine Leith as Lady Blandings
Graham Duckett as Banana Airlines Passenger
Alan Hopgood as Sir Harry Blandings

Production
John Lamond had been impressed with the script for Alvin Purple (1973) and approached its original writer, Alan Hopgood with the idea of making a comedy about a broken down airline in the style of the Carry On films. Hopgood thought it was a good idea which could have led to a long-running series of comedies set in exotic locations around the world, with titles like Tokyo Banana and Guyana Banana. Lamond wanted to cast two English actors, Robin Stewart and Luan Peters, to give the movie more of a Carry On feel.

The film was funded by the South Australian Film Corporation. According to Lamond, this led to the film being toned down when it should have been more like Alvin Purple.

The movie was shot immediately before Nightmares (1980), also from Lamond, and edited at the same time. Filming took place in Norwood Studios, Adelaide, and Tahiti. Lamond later said he wished the island scenes had been shot in Queensland "because when you go overseas with a low budget, people want to stay in nice places and you can see the money going out the door. Just in overheads." But filming in Tahiti was a requirement of some of the investors. Lamond says the three-week shoot on the island was tough because the weather was hot and the location was isolated, making the cast and crew go stir crazy.

Deborah Gray and Luan Peters wrote a theme song for fun during the shoot and Lamond liked it so much he decided to use it in the film.

Reception
The film was not the commercial success everyone hoped. Alan Hogood felt the film departed from his original concept, becoming more slapstick orientated. Lamond believed he should have made the movie sexier. However it has since a developed a cult following.

The South Australian Film Corporation is currently featuring the film on their website along with other films they funded in 1980.

References

External links
 
Pacific Banana at Oz Movies
Pacific Banana at AustLit

1981 comedy films